Hylandia is a genus of plants, of the family Euphorbiaceae, named in honour of Australian botanist Bernie Hyland, by Herbert K. Airy Shaw.

Hylandia dockrillii, commonly named blushwood, is the only known species. It is native to the Cook region in Queensland, Australia.

References

Codiaeae
Monotypic Euphorbiaceae genera
Endemic flora of Australia